is a Japanese former Nippon Professional Baseball outfielder.

References

External links

1952 births
Living people
Baseball people from Osaka Prefecture
Hosei University alumni
Japanese baseball players
Nippon Professional Baseball outfielders
Nankai Hawks players
Kintetsu Buffaloes players
Japanese baseball coaches
Nippon Professional Baseball coaches